Kilcrohane  is a village in County Cork, Ireland. It is the last coastal village on the Sheep's Head Peninsula after Durrus and Ahakista. Kilcrohane lies under the 'Shadow of Seefin' (the area's highest hill) and is also close to Caher Mountain. The village overlooks Dunmanus Bay.

Cill Crochain
'Cill Crochain' is Irish for the 'Church of Crochan'. Little is known about Crochan except that he is reputed to have lived around the time of Saint Patrick (mid 5th century). Some believe Crochan was from County Kerry, near Caherdaniel where there are two ruined churches named after him and a village also called Kilcrohane.

There is a ruined church in the grounds of the cemetery in Kilcrohane, thought to be where Crohan built his cell.

Tourism
The seaside village of Kilcrohane increases in population in the summer months. It has two pubs, a café gallery, three restaurants and a coffee shop (open in July and August). The local shop is a post office and filling station. There is also a local co-operative shop selling local produce, arts and crafts. There are a number of Bed and Breakfasts, several self-catering holiday accommodations, and a garage/repair shop that also rents bicycles.

The Kilcrohane pier is used for swimming, and there are a number of private coves along the coast. There is pollock and mackerel in Dunmanus Bay.

Kilcrohane has a primary school and a church. There is daily transportation to secondary schools in Bantry and public transportation to Bantry twice a week. There is also a community field and hall and a children's playground with tennis court.

Sheep's Head Way
Kilcrohane is base for the hill walking route, the Sheep's Head Way. The Sheep's Head Way features over 60 miles of marked maintained hill and road walking routes with views of Bantry and Dunmanus Bays. The area also has marked road cycling route.

Museum and gallery
The Alice West Centre, a museum focusing on the life and art of the late English-born artist Alice West, is open during the summer months and is run by the Muintir Bhaire Community Council. Alice West bequeathed her estate to the community, and the museum displays local artifacts, crafts, and artwork.

The White House Gallery and coffee shop is a gallery space that retains a few fixtures of the White House Bar. Situated one mile west of Kilcrohane, it lays at a crossroads at which, according to its website, people would "travel across the water from Beara and the Mizen to meet, play music, sing and dance".

Festivals
Kilcrohane has a number of festivals throughout the year, including the 'Craic on the Coast' traditional music festival which takes place annually on Easter weekend. A 'Kilcrohane Carnival' is also held every year on the third week of July (depending on the weather). This carnival features a number of events, races, a track and field event, and fishing competition.

Notable people
 Aonghus O'Daly (1570-1617), bardic poet, was born in the Kilcrohane townland of Cora
 Patrick Joseph Sullivan (1885-1935), U.S. Senator for Wyoming, was born in the area
 J. G. Farrell (1935-1979), writer, lived in Kilcrohane
 Denis O'Donovan (b.1955), senator, is from the area
 Ralph Fiennes (b.1962), actor, briefly lived here in the 1970s and attended Kilcrohane National School
 Christy Moore (b.1945), folk singer, had a property here
 Ivor Callely (b.1958), former politician and senator, also has a holiday residence here

See also
 List of towns and villages in Ireland

Further reading

References

Towns and villages in County Cork